Eryx colubrinus, the Egyptian or Kenyan sand boa, is a species of snake in the family Boidae. The species is endemic to Northern and Eastern Africa. Three subspecies are recognized.

Description
The Egyptian sand boa is heavily-built snake with a small head, small eyes, vertical pupils, and a short tail. Scale texture is extremely smooth, except on the tail, which is covered in bumps. Adult female specimens of G. colubrinus are rarely more than 91 cm (3 feet) in total length (including tail). The average Egyptian sand boa grows no longer than 12-24" (30-60cm) long, with males being significantly smaller than females. 

The color pattern may consist of a yellow or orange coloration overlaid with dark brown splotches. The belly is white- or cream-colored. It is readily available in the pet trade due to its small size, docility and ease of care. In recent years, there have been a number of new color morphs made available by both commercial and hobby breeders. Some of the more popular morphs available include anerythristic Egyptian sand boas (black and white lacking orange/red simple recessive trait), albino Egyptian sand boas (lacking black pigment simple recessive trait), snow ESBs (double recessive combination of an anerythristic and an albino), stripes (normal-colored, anerythristic, albino and snow), hypo/ghost, anerythristic ESBs, paradox albinos (simple recessive trait), paradox snows (double recessive trait), splash (recessive trait), paint (recessive trait) and stripe combinations with any of the listed recessive traits. In addition, many line bred traits have been accentuated on the above morphs, such as Nuclears (extreme red), High Whites and Reduced Patterns, for example.

Common names
Common names for E. colubrinus include East African sand boa, Egyptian sand boa, Kenyan sand boa, and sand boa.

Geographic range
Eryx colubrinus is found in North Africa from Egypt as far west as Niger (Aïr), including Somalia, Ethiopia, Sudan, Kenya, and northern Tanzania. A single specimen has been reported from Yemen. The type locality given is "Ægypto".

Habitat
Eryx colubrinus occurs in semi-desert and scrub savannahs and rock outcroppings. It prefers sandy, friable soil.

Behavior
Eryx colubrinus is most active at night, but may be irregularly active during the day. This species is fossorial and spends most of its time underground. During the hotter times of the year, E. colubrinus seeks refuge beneath stones and in the burrows of small mammals. However, they have also been known to occasionally climb trees.

Diet
Eryx colubrinus feeds on small mammals (such as rodents), lizards and birds that are quickly seized when passing within striking range and killed by constriction. Occasionally, they have been known to hunt out the nests of small mammals and birds.

Reproduction
Eryx colubrinus is ovoviviparous. In captivity, it breeds readily November through April in the United States, delivering live birth averaging 10-20 babies born spring through late summer. The young at birth typically are 20–25 cm (8-10 inches) in length.

Taxonomy
A synonym for this species, Eryx colubrinus, is Anguis colubrina, given by Linnaeus.

Stimson (1969) recognized two subspecies: Eryx colubrinus colubrinus  and E. c. loveridgei , but mentioned that a number of other authors, including Ahl (1933), Loveridge (1936), Scortecci (1939), and Parker (1949), questioned whether E. c. loveridgei was valid and considered the species to be monotypic with geographic variation.

When recognized, Eryx colubrinus loveridgei is said to occur in the southern part of the range and is described as being more orange in color.

A third subspecies, Eryx colubrinus rufescens, is smaller and more rounded than E. c. loveridgei, with rougher scales.

Etymology
The subspecific name loveridgei is in honor of British herpetologist Arthur Loveridge.

References

External links

colubrinus
Reptiles described in 1758
Taxa named by Carl Linnaeus